The Opel Kadett C is a small family car which was produced by the German automobile manufacturer Opel from 1973 to 1979. The Kadett C, which was the third generation of the Opel Kadett, was released in August 1973, and was Opel's version of the General Motors' "T-Car". It was the last small Opel to feature rear-wheel drive, and remained in production at Opel's Bochum plant until July 1979, by which time Opel had produced 1,701,076. Of these, 52% had been exported outside West Germany, most of them to markets in other parts of western Europe. In other world markets however, various badge engineered versions of the Kadett C remained in production as late as the mid 1990s under other GM brand names.

Despite being out of mainstream production since 1979, in Europe the Kadett C retains something of a cult following (along with its Vauxhall Chevette sister) largely due to its popularity in the sport of drifting where its conventional rear wheel drive layout is valued, and its ability to be easily upgraded with engines from larger Opel cars.

Bodies

The body of the Kadett C was seen as being less lumpy and better proportioned than that of the Kadett B. In terms of overall dimensions, however, the two were actually very similar.

Most customers opted for the "Limousine" bodied saloon/sedan car which came with two doors. A four-door "Limousine" was produced mostly for export to markets where cars of this size with only two doors encountered customer resistance. In West Germany itself, however, the small family car market continued to be dominated and defined by Volkswagen for whom two doors in a small family car was still quite sufficient: the four door Kadett C is remembered in Germany as an "export special". The Limousine body accounted for just under 63% of the Opel Kadett Cs produced. A further 11% were three door estate-bodied cars badged, following Opel tradition, as the Kadett Caravan, with the two-door coupés accounting for slightly under 10%. Publicity of the time, possibly originating with Mercedes-Benz, indicated that in order to minimize the risk of fire in the event of collision, the safest position for a car's fuel tank was above the rear axle between the passenger cabin and the boot/trunk, and this is where the Kadett C "Limousine" and "Coupé" had their fuel tanks fitted, accessible for replenishment via the (unexpectedly, hinged,) extractor vent on the car's right-side C-pillar. On the "Caravan" bodied estate car the fuel tank was a flatter shape, and was positioned under the rear cargo area.

At the end of May 1975 the "Kadett City" was added to the range. This was a three door hatchback intended to compete on price (though not on space efficiency) with the Ford Fiesta, launched in Germany in the same month. The concept had first originated on the Kadett C's Vauxhall sister car the Chevette which was launched first. The unique panelwork for the Kadett City was in fact produced at Vauxhall's Ellesmere Port plant and exported to Bochum for assembly into finished bodyshells. The Kadett City sat on the same wheelbase as the other Kadett Cs, but the rear overhang was shortened. The fuel tank was positioned under the floor of the luggage compartment at the back, as on the Caravan bodied cars, but the fuel tank on the "Kadett City" had a capacity of only 37 litres as against 43 litres for the slightly longer "Kadett Caravan". Both models featured rear seats that could be folded forward to give a long and relatively unimpeded load area. 263,090 "Kadett City" bodied cars were produced, representing more than 15% of the Kadett Cs produced by Opel, Germany.

Exhibited at the Geneva Motor Show in March 1976, and included in the range from that year was the Aero-Kadett, an open-top Kadett with targa roll bar, detachable roof insert and a separate convertible top aft of the roll bar (like the contemporary Lancia Beta Spider). This car was built in limited numbers by Karosserie Baur in Stuttgart. Removing the removable parts of the Kadett Aero's roof was a cumbersome process and the manufacturer's recommended retail price was very much higher than that asked by Volkswagen for their 1303 Cabriolet. The Kadett Aero struggled to find buyers, and was withdrawn early in 1978 by which time 1,242 had been produced. Several decades later, however, the rarity of the Kadett Aero is one of the features that helps it to draw continued interest from old-timer enthusiasts.

Engines

Smaller Opel OHV 4-cylinder engines

1.2 litre (1973-1979)

The Kadett C was launched in Germany with the 1.2 litre engine that had become an option for the Kadett B in 1971. However, the 1,196 cc engine was now also available as a "1.2N" with a lower 7.8: 1 compression ratio and in this form it produced a maximum  of power at 5,600 rpm.

The 1.2 litre unit powered 1,389,940 of the European Kadett Cs, equivalent to almost 82% of the Kadett Cs produced by Opel in West Germany and at their daughter plant in Belgium.

1.0 litre (1974-1979)

From March 1974 Opel added the a lower compression 1.0 litre version of the engine to the range, this featured the same 993 cc capacity as when first seen in the Kadett A, although now the compression ratio was slightly higher (7.9 :1) than in 1962. Performance, with a top speed at 127 km/h (79 mph) for the "Limousine" and 122 km/h (76 mph) for the "Caravan" was, by the standards of 1974, distinctly underwhelming with this power unit. Quoted fuel consumption was slightly better than with the 1.2 litre cars, but in terms of overall running costs for the cars there was no corresponding reduction in running costs when choosing the 1.0 engine in preference to the 1.2N.

Nevertheless, following the 1973 Oil price shock car buyers in western Europe had become far more economy minded. The 1.0 engines fitted in the Kadett B had been reserved for countries in the Mediterranean with punitive car tax levels, but with the Kadett C the manufacturer made cars powered by the smaller unit available to West German domestic buyers. 254,723 Kadett Cs using the 1.0 engine were produced whereas only 10,691 of the Kadett Bs produced had incorporated this anemic motor.

Larger Opel OHV "CIH" 4-cylinder engines

1.6 litre (1977 - 1979)
May 1977 saw the addition of a smaller version of Opel's Camshaft in Head (CIH) engine to the Kadett range, this time in high compression form as the "1.6S" unit.

1.9 litre (1975-1977)
For its first two years the Kadett C was offered with a choice between only the 1.0 litre and 1.2 litre motors, but September 1975 saw a return of the larger CIH power units to the Kadett range in the form of the Kadett GT/E, inheritor of the Kadett Rallye's mantle. The GT/E's 1897 cc engine had till 1973 featured in the earlier Kadett B range of power units, but now it incorporated "Bosch L-Jetronic" fuel-injection.

2.0 litre (1977-1979)
In September 1977 the 1.9 litre engine was replaced, in the "Rallye" Kadett, with a new enlarged 1979 cc unit. Fitted in the "Kadett Rallye 2.0E"  this engine produced  of power at 5400 rpm, which propelled the car to a top speed of 189 km/h (117 mph), comfortably faster than any previous "Rallye" branded performance Kadett. The car's fuel consumption, listed at 9.5 litres per 100 km (25/30 mpg US/UK), was also a clear improvement.

Running gear

Transmission
The car came with a four speed all-synchromesh manual transmission as standard, gear selection being performed using a centrally positioned floor-mounted lever. A five-speed manual transmission was offered as an option on top of the range GT/E Kadetts that appeared in 1975, and became a standard feature of the (now) 2-litre Kadett GT/E in 1977. On the 1.2 S and 1.6 litre engined cars it was also possible to specify the option of a "GM Strasbourg" Turbo-Hydramatic 180 three-speed automatic transmission.

Brakes
At launch, Kadett Cs powered by the 1.0 litre and the lower compression version of the 1.2 litre engine were delivered fitted with  diameter drum brakes on all four wheels. It was possible to specify front disc brakes, which, following an upgrade in January 1975, became standard fittings on all Kadetts. Servo-assistance for the brakes was also initially an option which became a standard fitting - in this case from May 1975 - on these less powerful Kadetts. On cars fitted with the higher compression version of the 1.2 litre engine and on cars with larger engines, the combination of front wheel disc brakes and rear wheel drum brakes, supported by servo-assistance had come as standard equipment from 1973. The brakes on the Kadett C were operated via a twin circuit hydraulic mechanism.

More equipment and a small facelift (1977 & 1978)
In terms of comfort and equipment, the Kadett C was launched with two available levels of trim and equipment, either as a standard or a "Kadett L" model. In May 1977 these were joined by the "Kadett Berlina", featuring the larger 1.6 litre "S" engine under the bonnet/hood and an enhanced package of trim and equipment on the inside. On the outside the Berlina was distinguished by a discrete chrome side strip along the length of the car redesigned headlights, now rectangular in shape and a little larger than hitherto. The larger headlights appeared to be part of a single unit also incorporating turn indicators now positioned directly adjacent to the lights at the car's front corners. The Opel "Blitz" logo was also larger, and moved from the leading edge of the bonnet into the grille. The new headlights and front indicator flashers were also included from May 1977 on the "L" models, while the standard cars retained the smaller headlamps with which the Kadett C had been launched, along, as before, with turn indicators below the front bumper.

In the Autumn/Fall of 1978 the larger headlights and turn indicators were also applied to the remaining Kadett Cs.

Broadening the range for the sportingly inclined

Kadett GT/E (1975-1979) 
The Kadett C sporting "Coupé GT/E" models appeared in August 1975, a year before the rival Volkswagen Golf GTI. The GT/E was priced, in 1975, at 12,950 Marks, approximately 30% higher than the manufacturer's listed retail price (9,970 Marks) for a "1.2S" powered Kadett coupé. The fuel-injected performance coupé now provided a basis for competition cars. Advertising of the time featured an aggressive two-tone yellow and white paint scheme, although it was also possible to specify a conventional "everyday" body colour. The rear wheel suspension was enhanced through the integration of vertically mounted telescopic gas-filled Bilstein shock-absorbers which enhanced road holding and provided a firm "sporting" quality to the ride.

Beginning in 1975, the Kadett GT/E became available with a five-speed manual transmission at extra cost. In 1977, the five-speed transmission became a standard feature on the Kadett GT/E.

 Opel Kadett GT/E - Black/yellow - 8660 produced between 1975 and 1977.
 Opel Kadett GT/E 2 - Yellow/white - 2254 produced between 1977 and 1979.
 Opel Kadett Rallye 1.6S and 2.0E - Yellow/white - 8549 produced between 1978 and 1979.

Kadett Rallye (1977-1979) 
September 1977 saw the return of the "Kadett Rallye" label for a Kadett Coupé that provided seriously superior performance to the "shopping trolley" Kadetts of the time, but was half a notch down from the GT/E in terms of price and of uncompromising performance. The Rallye was offered with a choice between the carburetted "1.6S" and the fuel injected "2.0E" engine, the larger of which at the same time became available in a high performance version of Opel's larger Rekord E. Outputs are  respectively. The rear wheel suspension was enhanced through the inclusion of vertically mounted telescopic shock-absorbers produced by the manufacturer's Spanish component factory.

The "world car"
In Brazil the Kadett C was released in 1973, six months before its European release, as the Chevrolet Chevette. It was available with a choice of three petrol engines, in 1.4 L, 1.6 L, and 1.0 L displacements (the latter available only for the 1992/1993 model year); 1.4 L and 1.6 L versions were also available running on ethanol.

This Chevette went through several redesigns — first front and rear panels similar to the Opel version, then a look similar to the British Vauxhall Chevette, and finally a design reminiscent of the updated USA Chevrolet Chevette version. It was available in several different bodies: hatchback (1979–1987), three-door estate (called Chevrolet Marajó, 1980–1989), pickup (Chevy 500, 1984–1995) and saloon (1973–1993). The Chevette sold over 1.6 million units in Brazil until replaced by the Chevrolet Corsa.

The T-Car was also built in Japan by Isuzu and sold as the Isuzu Gemini and in Australia where it was marketed as the Holden Gemini. In South Korea, Saehan Motor then Daewoo Motor built a version of the Gemini originally known as the Saehan Gemini, later becoming the Daewoo Maepsy and Maepsy-Na after a final facelift.

The Kadett C reached the United States as the Buick–Opel. This was an Isuzu Gemini; an updated version of this car was marketed in the USA as the Isuzu I-Mark in the early 1980s.

In Argentina GM manufactured a modified version with a locally developed 1.8 L 4-cylinder OHV motor - based on the six-cylinder 194 engine - as the Opel K-180 in three versions "Base", "Rally" and "LX" from 1974 until 1979. Production ended when GM Argentina closed its doors.

The T-Car also formed the basis of the British Vauxhall Chevette, which had a restyled front end and launched with a hatchback body, in addition to using a 1,256 cc OHV (over-head valve) Vauxhall engine rather than the 1,196 cc OHV Opel engine. The Chevette made the Kadett C notable by allowing it to become Opel's first hatchback — a new version named Kadett City appeared in August 1975, based on the Chevette's hatchback body. The Kadett's coupé body style was never manufactured as a Chevette however. Although Kadett C production ended in 1979, the Chevette was produced until January 1984. Unusually for Vauxhall models, the Chevette was imported to Germany starting in 1979, to satisfy the need for a cheaper car than the Kadett D. This import version, however was never officially badged as an Opel or a Vauxhall - being named simply as 'Chevette'. It was replaced by the Corsa A.

References

Cars introduced in 1973
Sedans
Station wagons
Kadett C
Compact cars
Coupés
Convertibles